Cechenena aegrota, the mottled green hawkmoth, is a species of moth in the family Sphingidae. It was described by Arthur Gardiner Butler in 1875. It is known from Nepal, north-eastern India (Sikkim, Meghalaya), Bangladesh, Thailand, Laos, southern China (Hainan, Hong Kong) and Vietnam.

Males in this species have a wingspan of 72-76 millimetres, while females have a wingspan of 88-92 millimetres. This species is sexually dichromatic, with females being darker and browner than males. Adults are on wing from March to December, with a main peak in April in Hong Kong.

The larvae feed on Psychotria species.

Subspecies
Cechenena aegrota aegrota
Cechenena aegrota kueppersi Eitschberger, 2007 (northern Vietnam)

References

Cechenena
Moths described in 1875